Cylindrepomus laetus is a species of beetle in the family Cerambycidae. It was described by Pascoe in 1858. It is known from Malaysia, Sumatra and Java. It contains the varietas Cylindrepomus laetus var. shelfordi.

References

Dorcaschematini
Beetles described in 1858